Elizabeth Mills-Robertson is a former Ghanaian police officer and was the acting Inspector General of Police of the Ghana Police Service from 28 January 2009 to 15 May 2009. She is the first and only woman to have acted as IGP of Ghana.

References

Ghanaian police officers
Ghanaian women police officers
Ghanaian Inspector Generals of Police
Living people
20th-century births
Year of birth missing (living people)